The eighteenth series of the British medical drama television series Holby City commenced airing in the United Kingdom on 13 October 2015, and concluded on 4 October 2016. The series consists of 52 episodes. Oliver Kent continues his position as the show's executive producer, while Simon Harper serves as the series producer. Sixteen cast members reprised their roles from the previous series, while several recurring characters, and numerous guest stars feature in the series. Four actors depart during the series and two cast members reprise their roles after taking breaks in the previous series. Jemma Redgrave appeared in the series between February and September 2016 as general surgeon Bernie Wolfe. Jason Robertson joined the semi-regular cast in February 2016 as Jason Haynes, and two new cast members joined the serial in summer 2016: Marc Elliott as registrar Isaac Mayfield and Lucinda Dryzek as F1 doctor Jasmine Burrows.

Several crossover events with Holby City sister show Casualty occurred during the series. Four Holby City cast members appeared in Casualty during the series, while five Casualty actors starred in Holby City during the series, including former Holby City actress Amanda Mealing. Several storylines featured in the series with on-off relationships becoming a common theme throughout. One storyline sees CT1 doctor Dominic Copeland (David Ames) attacked by an aggressive partner, who is married. A prominent storyline in the series is CT2 doctor Arthur Digby's (Rob Ostlere) melanoma diagnosis, which proves to be terminal. Ostlere raised awareness for the illness off-screen too, and the story concluded in "I'll Walk You Home", which features Ostlere's departure.

Series 18 of Holby City attracted 4.5 million viewers on average with three episodes failing to reach the top 30 rated programmes of the week. During the series, Holby City was nominated for several awards, including a nomination at the 2016 British Academy Television Awards and the 2016 Broadcast Awards. Four cast members and three storylines were nominated at the 2016 Inside Soap Awards, and Ostlere won the "Best Drama Star" accolade. The serial also received a positive reaction to the characters and storylines with a domestic abuse storyline featured in the series prompting 177 calls to the BBC Action Line and 2,032 visits to the BBC Action Line's website.

Episodes

Production 
Holby City eighteenth series was produced by the BBC and aired its 52 episodes on BBC One in the United Kingdom. The series aired in the 8 pm timeslot on Tuesdays across the United Kingdom, except in Scotland, where the series has no fixed timeslot. Each episode runs for 60 minutes. There was no break between series 17 and series 18, with the premiere of series 18 airing one week after the finale of series 17, in the same timeslot. Oliver Kent continues his role as the executive producer of the show, while Simon Harper serves as the series producer. In October 2015, Harper announced the show would receive a new opening titles sequence and the new sequence was first previewed in November 2015. The new opening titles sequence first aired in the episode, "In Which We Serve", broadcast on 1 December 2015 as the eighth episode of the series. Harper confirmed in October 2015 that the series would feature a standalone episode, which would air in January 2016. The episode centres around junior doctors, Arthur Digby (Rob Ostlere), Morven Shreve (Eleanor Fanyinka), Oliver Valentine (James Anderson) and Zosia March (Camilla Arfwedson), and Harper confirmed that it would answer several "'will they, won't they?' questions". The episode, "Young Hearts, Run Free", aired on 5 January 2016 as the thirteenth episode of the series.

Crossovers 
This series featured several crossover events with Holby City sister show Casualty. Harper confirmed this series would feature crossovers with the show, especially around the time of Casualty thirtieth anniversary in September 2016. Guy Henry made three guest appearances as Henrik Hanssen in Casualty between January and May 2016, while Rosie Marcel guest appeared in a February 2016 episode of Casualty as her character Jac Naylor. On 28 June 2016, it was announced that Marcel, Henry and Alex Walkinshaw would guest appear in Casualty feature-length anniversary episode "Too Old for This Shift", originally broadcast on 27 August 2016, as their characters Jac, Hanssen and Adrian "Fletch" Fletcher respectively. Walkinshaw previously appeared in the serial as a regular character between 2012 and 2014. Marcel and John Michie, who portrays Guy Self, appeared again in Casualty two episodes later.

On 27 August 2016, it was confirmed that Amanda Mealing would appear in an episode of Holby City as her character Connie Beauchamp. The actress previously appeared in the serial between 2004 and 2010. Mealing appeared in episode 47, "Protect and Serve", broadcast on 30 August 2016. Michael Stevenson and Lloyd Everitt also appeared in the episode as paramedics Iain Dean and Jez Andrews while Tonicha Lawrence guest starred as Steph Sims, a patient who appeared in Casualty. George Rainsford also appeared during the eighteenth series as his Casualty character, Ethan Hardy. Rainsford appeared for Ostlere's final scenes as Arthur Digby after they pleaded with producers to allow them to share a scene together.

Storyline development 
In an October 2015 interview with Daniel Kilkelly of Digital Spy, Harper revealed a selection of upcoming storylines to feature in the series. He explained that a "dramatic and exciting" twist in a storyline involving Cara Martinez (Niamh Walsh) and her husband, Jed Martinez (Jody Latham), would challenge Cara's relationship with Raf di Lucca (Joe McFadden), while a theme of "people's pasts coming back to haunt them" would be explored with the characters of Mo Effanga (Chizzy Akudolu) and Serena Campbell (Catherine Russell). He stated that Mo would re-evaluate her life and relationship with Derwood "Mr T" Thompson (Ben Hull) following the return of her surrogate son, whereas Serena would begin a relationship in a new storyline before her past is explored. Harper also announced plans to explore the on-again, off-again relationships between audience favourites Zosia and Oliver, Arthur and Morven, Sacha Levy (Bob Barrett) and Essie Harrison (Kaye Wragg), and Mo and Mr T, adding that they would answer some ongoing questions in late 2015. He also stated that Zosia and Oliver would be "caught in the crossfire" of Jac Naylor's (Rosie Marcel) rivalry with Guy Self (John Michie) following Guy's move to Darwin ward. Harper said that Sacha and Essie's relationship would be challenged by Essie wanting to have a child as well as Sacha's Jewish family being unable to overlook Essie's grandfather's Nazi background. Harper also expressed an interest in creating more nurse characters as he felt the show lacked nursing characters.

In February 2016, David Ames revealed that his character, Dominic Copeland, would be attacked. The storyline began in autumn 2015 when Dominic begins a relationship with patient Lee Cannon (Jamie Nichols), although he is "gutted" when Lee steals from him and disappears. Lee returns when his pregnant wife, Alison Jones (Elizabeth Cadwallader), is admitted onto Keller ward, where she discovers Lee and Dominic had a fling. Lee becomes aggressive and confronts Dominic in the staffroom. Ames explained that Lee is "furious with the fact his whole world has crumbled" so Dominic reminds Lee about his misdemeanours. The actor stated that when Lee grabs a knife, he creates a "tug of war" between them and someone is stabbed. The storyline is revisited in May 2016 when Alison is readmitted onto the ward, leaving Dominic astounded. Dominic helps Alison as she delivers her child, but he becomes enraged when Alison asks him to accompany her to visit Lee in prison. Ames said that Dominic warns Alison that "you can't hold on to the past", something which he has to remind himself.

In his October 2015 interview with Kilkelly, Harper teased a "heartbreaking and touching" storyline to air in 2016 which would bring together every character. This storyline commenced in February 2016 when Arthur is tested as a liver donor for Morven's father, Austin Shreve (Clinton Blake). While testing, Essie discovers a mole on Arthur's back and believes it could be melanoma, however Arthur dismisses her claims as being "over-protective". Essie requests a second opinion from Hanssen, who orders for it to be removed and examined. Ostlere explained that Arthur "feels like the rug has been pulled out from under him" after his diagnosis. Off-screen, Ostlere raised awareness for melanoma, issuing his support during Melanoma Awareness Month. Arthur learns he has secondary tumours on his lungs, before discovering his treatment is not working and his cancer is terminal. The storyline concluded with Ostlere's departure from the show; on-screen, Arthur and Morven decided to travel together but before they can leave, Arthur collapses and falls unconscious. Since Arthur's cancer is too advanced, his life cannot be saved and he soon dies surrounded by his colleagues. Ostlere found filming his final scenes emotional and said he would miss playing the character.

Cast

Overview 
The eighteenth series of Holby City began with 16 roles receiving star billing, a similar amount to previous series. Guy Henry appeared as Henrik Hanssen, the hospital's chief executive officer and consultant general surgeon. Catherine Russell played deputy chief executive officer, clinical lead of the Acute Assessment Unit (AAU) and consultant general surgeon Serena Campbell. John Michie portrayed director of neurosurgery and consultant neurosurgeon Guy Self. Don Gilet stars as consultant anaesthetist and later, consultant general surgeon Jesse Law. Chizzy Akudolu featured as specialist registrar of cardiothoracic surgery and later, consultant cardiothoracic surgeon Mo Effanga. Bob Barrett appeared as Sacha Levy, the clinical skills tutor and specialist registrar, specialising in general surgery, who is later promoted to consultant general surgeon. James Anderson starred as cardiothoracic specialist registrar Oliver Valentine, while Joe McFadden portrayed Raf di Lucca, a specialist registrar of general surgery. Rob Ostlere appeared as CT2 doctor Arthur Digby, while Camilla Arfwedson and David Ames continued their roles as F2 doctors, and later CT1 doctors Zosia March and Dominic Copeland. Eleanor Fanyinka featured as F1 doctor, and later F2 doctor Morven Shreve (later credited as Morven Digby). Alex Walkinshaw starred as AAU ward manager Adrian Fletcher, while Kaye Wragg appeared as staff nurse and transplant co-ordinator Essie Harrison. Niamh Walsh portrayed staff nurse Cara Martinez, while Petra Letang featured as healthcare assistant and later, student nurse Adele Effanga. Additionally, Ben Hull and Carli Norris continued their semi-regular roles as Derwood "Mr T" Thompson, a consultant obstetrician and gynaecologist, and agency nurse Fran Reynolds.

Norris departed the serial in episode 11 at the conclusion of Fran's storyline. Letang made her final appearance as Adele in episode 25 after over two years in the role. Gilet also departed the serial and Jesse made his final appearance in episode 27. Hull temporarily departed the serial in episode 31, although returned in episode 48. Ostlere opted to quit his role as Arthur, with producers making the decision to kill off his character. The actor decided to leave to pursue new challenges, but stated the decision was "difficult". Arthur departed in episode 35 when he died following a battle with terminal cancer. Walsh left her role as Cara after appearing on the serial for a year. The character departed in episode 37.

After taking maternity leave in April 2015, Rosie Marcel returned to her role as consultant cardiothoracic surgeon Jac Naylor in November 2015. On Jac's return, Harper said, "What's great about Jac's return is that the bitch is definitely back." Jac returned in episode 7. Hugh Quarshie's return in the role of consultant general surgeon Ric Griffin was confirmed in October 2015, following his break during the previous series. It was revealed that upon his return, Ric would begin a new role within the hospital, later explained to be the clinical lead of Keller ward. Ric returned in episode 12. Jimmy Akingbola and Lauren Drummond reprised their roles as Antoine Malick and Chantelle Lane respectively for a cameo appearance in episode 35.

On 3 September 2015, it was announced that actress Jemma Redgrave would join the cast as "feisty" general surgeon Bernie Wolfe, who has experience working in the army. The character was created with Redgrave in mind and producers were "utterly thrilled" when she agreed to join the cast. Bernie initially appeared as a patient, before joining Keller ward. Redgrave was contracted for six months. Bernie arrived in episode 17, and departed in episode 51 at the conclusion of Redgrave's contract. Jason Haynes, portrayed by Jason Robertson, was introduced in episode 18 as the nephew of Serena. Robertson began filming with the serial in October 2015. Marc Elliott's casting in the role of Isaac Mayfield, a "charming, confident and twinkly" doctor, was announced in April 2016. Isaac is a love interest for Dominic, who joins Keller ward. Elliott was contracted for six months. The character made his first appearance in episode 37. Lucinda Dryzek joined the cast as Jac's half-sister, F1 doctor Jasmine Burrows in 2016. The character made her first appearance in episode 41. Commenting on her character, Dryzek said "Jasmine is a little firework. She's lovely, she's a really good doctor and very instinctive with her work. In some senses she's the complete opposite to Jac. She's cheery, fun and smiley." Episode 48 marked the first appearance of Inga Olsen (Kaisa Hammarlund), Mr T's fiancée who works as a bank nurse on Darwin ward.

Series 18 featured several recurring characters, and numerous guest stars. Jody Latham continued his role of Jed Martinez, the husband of Cara, from the previous series, departing in episode 6. Susannah Corbett reprised her role as Sorcia Winters in episode 1 to aid the introduction of William Winters (Jackson Allison), who appeared until episode 5. Caroline Lee-Johnson reprised her role as Patsy Brassvine from the previous series in episodes 4 and 5. Jamie Nichols began appearing in episode 5 as patient Lee Cannon, who becomes romantically involved with Dom. His storyline was teased by Harper who said it test Dom and Arthur's relationship. The character departed in episode 8, although he made another appearance in episode 18. Macey Chipping guest starred in episode 10 as Evie Fletcher, the daughter of Fletch. The character returned for two episodes in August 2016. Mark Healy joined the semi-regular cast in episode 12 as Robbie Medcalf, a love interest for Serena. The character was mentioned by Harper, who promised a romance for Serena. Rupert Frazer appeared between episodes 22 and 27 as Sir Dennis Hopkins-Clarke, a consultant cardiothoracic surgeon working on Darwin ward. Episode 30 marked the first appearance of Kai O'Loughlin, who portrays Mikey Fletcher, the son of Fletch. He continued to star in four further episodes until the end of the series. Lorna Brown starred in five episodes between episodes 30 and 39 as consultant psychiatrist Naomi Palmer, a love interest for Fletch and Raf. Jocelyn Jee Esien made her first appearance as pharmacist Mel Watson in episode 40, featuring prominently in the following episode as she was held hostage by a drug addict. Esien appeared in episode 44, before making her final appearance in episode 46. Cameron Dunn, the son of Bernie, was introduced in episode 44, portrayed by Nic Jackman. He made a further appearance in episode 47.

Main characters 
Chizzy Akudolu as Mo Effanga
David Ames as Dominic Copeland
James Anderson as Oliver Valentine
Camilla Arfwedson as Zosia March
Bob Barrett as Sacha Levy
Lucinda Dryzek as Jasmine Burrows
Eleanor Fanyinka as Morven Shreve
Don Gilét as Jesse Law
Guy Henry as Henrik Hanssen
Petra Letang as Adele Effanga
Rosie Marcel as Jac Naylor
Joe McFadden as Raf di Lucca
John Michie as Guy Self
Rob Ostlere as Arthur Digby
Hugh Quarshie as Ric Griffin
Jemma Redgrave as Bernie Wolfe
Catherine Russell as Serena Campbell
Alex Walkinshaw as Adrian Fletcher
Niamh Walsh as Cara Martinez
Kaye Wragg as Essie Harrison

Recurring characters 
Macey Chipping as Evie Fletcher
Marc Elliott as Isaac Mayfield
Kaisa Hammarlund as Inga Olsen
Mark Healy as Robbie Medcalf
Ben Hull as Derwood "Mr T" Thompson
Nic Jackman as Cameron Dunn
Jonathan McGuiness as Tristan Wood
Carli Norris as Fran Reynolds
Kai O'Loughlin as Mikey Fletcher
Jules Robertson as Jason Haynes

Guest characters 
Jimmy Akingbola as Antoine Malick
Jackson Allison as William Winters
Lorna Brown as Naomi Palmer
Darcey Burke as Emma Naylor
Susannah Corbett as Sorcia Winters
Lauren Drummond as Chantelle Lane
Jocelyn Jee Esien as Mel Watson
Lloyd Everitt as Jez Andrews
Rupert Frazer as Sir Dennis Hopkins-Clarke
Jody Latham as Jed Martinez
Tonicha Lawrence as Steph Sims
Caroline Lee-Johnson as Patsy Brassvine
Amanda Mealing as Connie Beauchamp
Jamie Nichols as Lee Cannon
George Rainsford as Ethan Hardy
Michael Stevenson as Iain Dean

Reception

Critical response 
On 29 December 2015, it was revealed that a storyline on Holby City about domestic abuse prompted 177 calls to the BBC Action Line and 2,032 visits to the BBC Action Line's website. Arthur's melanoma storyline also helped one viewer, Rachel Green, to realise that she has melanoma. Green credits the show with making her realise she might have melanoma after they raised awareness on the subject. Actor Jules Robertson received a positive response to his character Jason's introduction. Rachel Sigee of Evening Standard believed that his introduction would begin "a breakthrough year for actors with autism". Nick Llewellyn, the artistic director of charity Access All Areas, told Sigee that he thinks Holby City casting director Sarah Hughes began the process that led to more awareness when she created the BBC Talent Alert for disabled actors.

The series received praise from television critics. The introduction of Jasmine Burrows (episode 41) was enjoyed by Vicki Power (Daily Express), who described her entrance as "memorable" and "like a shot in the arm for the medical soap". Victoria Wilson (What's on TV) called the scene where Fletch asks Raf to care for his children if he dies (episode 49) "heart-breaking". Episode 35, "I'll Walk You Home", was applauded by critics, who found it emotional and upsetting. Sara Wallis of the Daily Mirror dubbed the episode "a particularly gritty and gruelling episode of Holby City". Sarah Deen, writing for the Metro, called the episode "one of [the show's] saddest episodes ever" and said that it managed to "pull at the heart strings". Anthony D. Langford of TVSource Magazine was upset by Arthur's exit and said that he would miss the character. However, he anticipated Isaac's arrival in episode 37 and predicted a "nice meaty love story" between him and Dom.

Accolades 
During series eighteen, Holby City was nominated for the "Best Soap and Continuing Drama" award at the 2016 British Academy Television Awards, however lost to BBC soap opera EastEnders. In November 2015, the serial was nominated in the "Best Soap/Continuing Drama" category at the 2016 Broadcast Awards, Judges credited storylines such as Arthur's death, Serena and Bernie's "blooming" romance, Jasmine's introduction and crossovers with Casualty as reasons for the serial's nomination. At the 2016 Inside Soap Awards, the storylines "Arthur's death", "Fletch saves the day!", and "Zosia and Ollie's romance" were longlisted in the "Best Drama Storyline" category; the first two were then shortlisted and "Arthur's death" was announced as winner. At the same awards ceremony, four cast members — Ames, Ostlere, Arfwedson and Marcel − were longlisted in the "Best Drama Star" category; Ames and Ostlere were then shortlisted. Actress Fanyinka was nominated in the "Rising Star" category and semi-regular cast member Francis was nominated in the "Male Performance in TV" category at the Screen Nation Film and Television Awards in March 2016.

Ratings 
Holby City eighteenth series averaged 4.5 million viewers. Three episodes of the series failed to reach the top 30 rated programmes. On 17 November 2015, episode 6 received 3.64 million viewers and a 15.8% share of the viewing audience, a drop in ratings due to clashing with a football match. Despite being above the series average, episode 11, broadcast on 22 December 2015, failed to reach the top 30 rated programmes with 4.54 million viewers and a 21.2% share of the viewing audience. The following episode, broadcast on 29 December 2015, received 4.23 million viewers and a 20% share of the viewing audience. Additionally, episode 33, broadcast on 24 May 2016, experienced a drop in ratings to 3.84 million viewers.

Notes

References

External links
 Holby City series 18 at BBC Online
 Holby City series 18 at the Internet Movie Database

18
2015 British television seasons
2016 British television seasons